Disney Channel is a Romanian pay television channel owned by The Walt Disney Company Limited in London.

It broadcasts for preschoolers and kids, and also for teenagers and adults, from series and movies.

History
After Disney XD was successfully launched on 13 February 2009 in the United States, the Disney-ABC Television Group re-branded Jetix France to Disney XD on 1 April 2009 and it was expected to be rolled out to other European countries in that same year. In May, Disney announced that Jetix in certain countries (namely Hungary, Romania, the Czech Republic, Slovakia and Bulgaria) would be rebranded as Disney Channel, marking that channel's first introduction in those countries. The change occurred on 19 September 2009.

In May 2010 Disney Channel Eastern Europe was removed from Hot Bird satellite. Advertising is shown in Romanian and Bulgarian; the voices in the ads are only heard on the respective audio tracks.

In October 1, 2019 Disney Channel Eastern Europe separated into a Romanian channel.

In September 1, 2022 Disney Channel Romanian was rebranded, but Promo as only Time, Later the Localised promo text was added.

Programming

See also 
 Disney Junior (Romania)
 Disney Channel (Bulgaria)

References

External links 
 

Romania
Romania
Television stations in Romania
Children's television networks
Television channels and stations established in 2005

ru:Disney Channel Romania